Juan Carlos Gauto (born 2 June 2004) is an Argentine professional footballer who plays for Huracán.

Club career 
Juan Gauto made his professional debut for Club Atlético Huracán on the 15 April 2022 against Tigre.

References

External links

2004 births
Living people
Argentine footballers
Argentina youth international footballers
Association football midfielders
People from Santa Cruz Province, Argentina
Club Atlético Huracán footballers
Argentine Primera División players